The 2006 Wandsworth Council election took place on 4 May 2006 to elect members of Wandsworth London Borough Council in London, England. The whole council was up for election and the Conservative party stayed in overall control of the council.

The Conservatives were always expected to hold control and the low rates of council tax in Wandsworth were used as an example by the Conservatives in neighbouring councils such as Hammersmith and Fulham. During the campaign one Labour candidate, Nick Bowes, had said that the party was being well beaten and described the campaign as being "miserable, exhausting and lonely".

Election result

Ward results

References

2006 London Borough council elections
2006